The Ice Princess is a crime novel by Swedish author Camilla Läckberg. As her debut novel, it was originally published in 2003 in Swedish, entitled Isprinsessan. The novel follows detective Patrik Hedström and writer Erica Falck investigating a suspicious suicide. A sequel, The Preacher was published in 2004 and subsequently translated to English in 2009.

Plot
Writer Erica Falck, has returned to her family home in Fjällbacka after her parents died. While coping with the death of her parents, she is trying to work on a biography of Selma Lagerlöf, a Swedish author and the first female writer to win the Nobel Prize in Literature.

Patrik Hedström, a detective, is assigned to investigate a case in which the victim, Erica's childhood friend Alex, is found frozen in a bathtub, her wrists cut in an apparent suicide. The investigation shows that the young woman's death occurred before she was placed in the tub, allowing the liquid to freeze around her as the temperature dropped far below freezing inside her house. Exactly when the furnace went out-of-order is a timely coincidence to the alleged suicide.

At the prompting of Alex's parents, Erica begins to investigate the death of their daughter. Her breakthrough comes when she meets a police officer who is also investigating the mystery; together the two uncover dark secrets within the town. Erica and Patrick's fascination gives way to deep obsession as they struggle to determine the true circumstances surrounding the death. Erica visualizes a memoir about Alex, one that will answer questions about their missing friendship.

Critical reception 
Publishers Weekly review reflects that in her first novel, "Läckberg skillfully details how horrific secrets are never completely buried and how silence can kill the soul."  Kirkus Reviews notes that the novel turns up "the sordidness of the wealthy, the appalling effects of child abuse and the general mayhem that ensues whenever cabin fever sets in."

Characters
Erika Falck: Writer and journalist who gets involved as an amateur sleuth.
Patrik Hedström: Detective Inspector in Tanumshede, romantic interest of Erika.
Bertil Mellberg: Detective Chief Inspector, often seen as lazy and not very competent.
Gösta Flygare: Detective Inspector.
Anna Maxwell (née Falck): Erika's sister.
Lucas Maxwell: Anna's abusive husband.
Pernilla Karlsson: Wife of Erika’s high school sweetheart
Dan Karlsson: Pernilla's husband. Former boyfriend of Erika
Eilert Berg: Old working man who finds Alexandra's corpse.
Alexandra Wijkner (née Carlgen): Victim whose corpse is found in a frozen bath.
Henrik Wijkner: Alexandra's husband.
Karl Erik Carlgen: Alexandra's father, who lives in Särö.
Birgit Carlgen (née Persson): Alexandra's mother.
Julia Carlgen: Alexandra's thirteen year younger sister.
Nelly Lorentz: Widow of a rich businessman.
Nils Lorentz: Nelly's son, who disappeared many years ago.
Jan Lorentz: Nelly's adopted son, who took over the tin can food company.
Anders Nilsson: Alcoholic painter.
Vera Nilsson: Anders' mother.
Francine Sandberg (née Bijoux): Friend of Alexandra who started an art gallery with her.
Bengt Larsson: Former convict, friend of Anders.

Themes
The difficulty of parent-child relationships is a recurring theme in The Ice Princess. True to the genre of Scandinavian crime fiction (often called Nordic noir), a heavy emphasis is given to characterization and (especially in Lackberg's instance) the development of the small town where the crime occurs. The importance of the location is emphasized by the inclusion of a map of Fjällbacka, and the depictions of the landscape are both colorful and integral to the plot.  In multiple instances throughout the book, Läckberg. explores interesting details dealing with food, and body and self esteem issues.

References

External links 
Camilla Läckberg talks about The Ice Princess

2003 Swedish novels
Swedish crime novels
Novels by Camilla Läckberg
Novels set in Sweden
Grand Prix de Littérature Policière winners